The 2011 SCCA Pro Formula Enterprises season was the second, and last, season of the SCCA Pro Formula Enterprises. The series was sanctioned by SCCA Pro Racing. All drivers competed in Mazda powered, Hoosier shod Van Diemen DP06's.

Race calendar and results

Final standings

References

2011 in American motorsport